Pere Estupinyà Giné (born in Tortosa on 17 October 1974) is a Spanish Biochemist known for his work in Popular science in books, conferences and TV shows.

Biography 
Born in Tortosa (Spain), he studied at University of Rovira i Virgili in Tarragona, where he majored in biochemistry; he holds as well a Master in Nutrition and Metabolism and started a PhD in Genetics but gave up to work in popular science.

He has worked at Massachusetts Institute of Technology (MIT), in the National Institutes of Health (NIH) and the Inter-American Development Bank (IADB).

He wrote his first book —El ladrón de cerebros. Compartiendo el conocimiento científico de las mentes más brillantes— in 2010, and has since published several other popular science books. He started on TV in 2014 presenting a documentary for TV3 called Inversió de Futur (Investment for the future), and later he made a TV documentary based on his first book S=EX2. La ciencia del sexo, released in 2013. In 2015 he produced and presented 13 episode of the show El ladrón de cerebros en Ecuador, and the following year he developed, in collaboration with Minifilms, El cazador de cerebros, for the spanish national broadcasterTVE, which he also directed and presented. Since september 2016 he takes part in the radio weekend show A vivir que son dos días at la Cadena SER.

Books 
 El ladrón de cerebros. Compartiendo el conocimiento científico de las mentes más brillantes (Debate, 2010) 
 Rascar donde no pica (Debate, 2012)
 El sexo en la consulta médica (Debate, 2013)
 S=EX2. La ciencia del sexo (Debate, 2013)
 El ladrón de cerebros. Comer cerezas con los ojos cerrados (Debate, 2016)
A vivir la ciencia. Las pasiones que despierta el conocimiento (Debate, 2020)

References

External links 

 

Spanish biochemists
Spanish science writers
People from Tortosa
1974 births
Living people